Tsirang District (Dzongkha: རྩི་རང་རྫོང་ཁག་; Wylie: Rtsi-rang rdzong-khag; previously (Chirang), is one of the 20 dzongkhags (districts) of Bhutan. The administrative center of the district is Damphu.

Tsirang is noted for its gentle slopes and mild climates. The dzongkhag is also noted for its rich biodiversity; however, it is one of the few dzongkhags without a protected area. One of Bhutan's longest rivers, the Punatsang Chhu or Sankosh river flows through the district. It is the main district where the Lhotshampa resides. It has many beautiful places such as Rigsum Pemai Dumra, Pemachoeling Heritage Forest, Tsirang Namgyel Chholing Dratshang, and Nye.

Languages
The dominant language in Tsirang is Nepali, but it can be partially different from those spoken in Nepal, spoken by the heterogeneous Lhotshampa like Magar, Tamang, Gurung, Limbu, Rai, etc. In the north of Tsirang, Dzongkha, the national language, is also spoken.

Administrative divisions
Tsirang District is divided into twelve village blocks (or gewogs):

Barshong Gewog
Dunglegang Gewog
Gosarling Gewog
Kikhorthang Gewog
Mendrelgang Gewog
Patshaling Gewog
Phutenchhu Gewog
Rangthangling Gewog
Semjong Gewog
Sergithang Gewog
Tsholingkhar Gewog
Tsirangtoe Gewog

Geography
Tsirang covers a total area of 639 sq km. The northernmost reaches of Tsirang District (the gewogs of Phutenchhu and Sergithang) lie within Jigme Singye Wangchuck National Park, one of the protected areas of Bhutan.

See also
Districts of Bhutan

References

 
Districts of Bhutan